Trunk 14 is part of the Canadian province of Nova Scotia's system of Trunk Highways.

Route description

From a junction with Trunk 3 and Highway 103 in Chester, Trunk 14 runs north along the Windsor Road to Sherwood beside Card Lake, then northeast through Vaughan and Martock to a junction with Trunk 1 at Currys Corner, in Windsor.

Trunk 14 follows Route 1 for a short distance to Garlands Crossing, where Trunk 14 branches off to the east. The route continues through the village of Brooklyn (running concurrently with Route 215 for a short distance) and then proceeds through the Rawdon region, turning southeast along the Nine Mile River to Lower Nine Mile River, where it turns eastward to its end at a junction with Trunk 2 and Highway 102 at Milford Station in the Musquodoboit Valley region.

Major intersections

References

014
014
014